Eslamabad (also Romanized as Eslāmābād) is a village in Efzar Rural District, Efzar District, Qir and Karzin County, Fars Province, Iran. At the 2006 census, its population was 497, in 98 families.

References 

Populated places in Qir and Karzin County